Andrian Ianculescu (born 28 October 1973) is a retired  Romanian artistic gymnast. He is a bronze world medalist with the team and on vault.

References

1973 births
Living people
Romanian male artistic gymnasts
Gymnasts at the 1996 Summer Olympics
Olympic gymnasts of Romania
Medalists at the World Artistic Gymnastics Championships